Donald Robert Laz (May 17, 1929 – February 21, 1996) was an American pole vaulter. He won a silver medal at the 1952 Olympics and a bronze at the 1955 Pan American Games. Domestically he held the NCAA title in 1951 and shared the AAU title in 1953. After retiring from competitions he worked as an architect in Champaign, Illinois, and retired after suffering a stroke.

Personal life 
In January 1951 Laz married Nancy June Barber They had a son Doug, who also became a competitive pole vaulter.

References

1929 births
1996 deaths
Track and field athletes from Chicago
American male pole vaulters
Athletes (track and field) at the 1952 Summer Olympics
Olympic silver medalists for the United States in track and field
Athletes (track and field) at the 1955 Pan American Games
Pan American Games bronze medalists for the United States
Medalists at the 1952 Summer Olympics
Pan American Games medalists in athletics (track and field)
Medalists at the 1955 Pan American Games